Brittany Whitfield (born 17 February 1994) is an Australian football (soccer) player, who played for Sydney FC in the Australian W-League.

Honours
With Sydney FC:
  W-League Premiership: 2009
  W-League Championship: 2009

Peninsula Power FC Women 
In 2013 Whitfield scored 6 goals in 4 matches in the SEQ diamond league and in 2020 was the golden boot winner with 15 goals in the Brisbane Women's Premier League.

References

External links
 Sydney FC profile

1994 births
Living people
Australian women's soccer players
Sydney FC (A-League Women) players
Women's association football midfielders